This article attempts to list the oldest extant buildings in the state of Virginia.

See also 
List of the oldest buildings in the United States
List of National Historic Landmarks in Virginia
List of Registered Historic Places in Virginia
List of historic houses in Virginia

References 

Virginia
Oldest buildings